Hotel Berry on W. Central Ave. in Velva, North Dakota, United States, was built in 1906.  It was listed on the National Register of Historic Places (NRHP) in 1982.  The listing included two contributing buildings.

According to its 1981 NRHP nomination the hotel "represents a genre of first rate hotels built across North Dakota in an era marked by railroad travel and luxury accommodations. It is a visual reminder of the symbiotic relationship between railroad expansion and the development and maintenance of commercial/agricultural centers in the state."

References

Buildings designated early commercial in the National Register of Historic Places
Hotel buildings completed in 1906
Hotel buildings on the National Register of Historic Places in North Dakota
National Register of Historic Places in McHenry County, North Dakota
1906 establishments in North Dakota